Keewaydin can refer to:

Keewaydin (camp), Ontario, Canada
Keewaydin Club, on Keewaydin Island
Keewaydin Island, Florida
Keewaydin State Park, New York
Keewaydin, Minneapolis

See also
The Song of Hiawatha by Henry Wadsworth Longfellow, in which the northwest wind is called Keewaydin